The 1998 Adelaide International was a men's ATP tennis tournament played on outdoor hard courts in Adelaide, Australia. The tournament was held from 5 to 12 January. Sixteen-year old Lleyton Hewitt won the first title of his career.

Finals

Singles

 Lleyton Hewitt defeated  Jason Stoltenberg, 3–6, 6–3, 7–6(7–4).

Doubles

 Joshua Eagle /  Andrew Florent defeated  Ellis Ferreira /  Rick Leach, 6–4, 6–7, 6–3.

References

 

Australian Men's Hardcourt Championships
Hard
Next Generation Adelaide International
1990s in Adelaide
January 1998 sports events in Australia